Okinawan, spoken in Okinawa Island, was once the official language of the Ryukyu Kingdom. At the time, documents were written in kanji and hiragana, derived from Japan. 

Although generally agreed among linguists to be a distinct language, most Japanese, as well as some Okinawans, tend to think of Okinawan as merely a regional dialect of Japanese, even though it is not intelligible to monolingual Japanese speakers. Modern Okinawan is not written frequently. When it is, the Japanese writing system is generally used in an ad hoc manner. There is no standard orthography for the modern language. Nonetheless, there are a few systems used by scholars and laypeople alike. None of them are widely used by native speakers, but represent the language with less ambiguity than the ad hoc conventions. The Roman alphabet in some form or another is used in some publications, especially those of an academic nature.

Systems

Conventional usages
The modern conventional ad hoc spellings found in Okinawa.

Council system
The system devised by the Council for the Dissemination of Okinawan Dialect (沖縄方言普及協議会).

University of the Ryukyus system
This system was devised by Okinawa Center of Language Study, a section of University of the Ryukyus. Unlike others, this method is intended purely as a phonetic guidance, and basically only uses katakana. For the sake of an easier comparison, corresponding hiragana are used in this article.

New Okinawan letters
The rule applies to hiragana only. Katakana is used as in Japanese; just like in the conventional usage of Okinawan.

Basic syllables and kai-yōon (palatalized syllables)

 1: At the beginning of a word.

Gō-yōon (labialised syllables)

Others

 3: Hatsuon (moraic n)
 4: Sokuon (geminated consonants)
 5: Chōon (longer vowels): In conventional usages, longer vowels are sometimes spelled like in mainland Japanese as well; "ou" (おう) for ō, doubled kana for others. (e.g. うう for ū.)

References

Ryukyuan languages
Japanese writing system
Writing systems